The Hutzler Brothers Palace Building is a historic flagship department store building located at Baltimore, Maryland, United States and built by Hutzler's. It was constructed in 1888, with a south bay added in 1924. 

The original limestone Romanesque eclectic façade is three bays wide and five stories in height. The ground floor façade was redesigned in 1931 in the Art Moderne style.  Hutzler's is believed to hold the record for longevity in an original location among American department stores, having been founded on this site in 1858.

Hutzler Brothers Palace Building was listed on the National Register of Historic Places in 1984.

References

External links
, including photo from 1976, at Maryland Historical Trust

Buildings and structures in Baltimore
Commercial buildings on the National Register of Historic Places in Baltimore
Commercial buildings completed in 1888
Downtown Baltimore
Romanesque Revival architecture in Maryland
1888 establishments in Maryland